This is a list of road signs in Denmark.

A: Warning signs

B: Priority signs

C: Prohibitory signs

D: Mandatory signs

E: Information signs

F: Direction signs

G: Orientation signs

Historic signs

References 

 Sales catalog of road signs in Denmark (Danish)
 Danish Law Database (English translation)

External links 
 

Denmark